Oswego is an extinct town in Holmes County, in the U.S. state of Mississippi. The GNIS classifies it as a populated place.

History
The community's name is a transfer from Oswego, New York. A variant name was "Lacey".

References

Geography of Holmes County, Mississippi
Ghost towns in Mississippi